Matías Enrique Paredes (born 1 February 1982) is an Argentine field hockey player who plays as a midfielder or forward for Ducilo and the Argentine national team.

Club career
Paredes started his club career with Ducilo at age four in his native Argentina, before moving to Germany to play with UHC Hamburg in 2002. He then moved on to the Netherlands to play for Laren. He also played for SCHC in Bilthoven, Netherlands.

International career
Paredes made his debut for the national squad in 2001, and competed for his native country in the 2004 Summer Olympics and 2012 Summer Olympics.
With his national squad, Matías has won the bronze medal at the 2014 Men's Hockey World Cup and four gold medals at the Pan American Games (2003, 2011, 2015 and 2019). He has twice been named as one of the top 10 young players in the world by the International Field Hockey Council. In 2003 he was awarded the Silver Olimpia for the Best Argentine Hockey Player.

References

External links
 

1982 births
Living people
People from Quilmes
Argentine male field hockey players
Male field hockey midfielders
Male field hockey forwards
Olympic field hockey players of Argentina
2002 Men's Hockey World Cup players
Field hockey players at the 2004 Summer Olympics
2006 Men's Hockey World Cup players
Field hockey players at the 2007 Pan American Games
2010 Men's Hockey World Cup players
Field hockey players at the 2011 Pan American Games
Field hockey players at the 2012 Summer Olympics
2014 Men's Hockey World Cup players
Field hockey players at the 2015 Pan American Games
Field hockey players at the 2016 Summer Olympics
2018 Men's Hockey World Cup players
Field hockey players at the 2019 Pan American Games
Pan American Games gold medalists for Argentina
Pan American Games silver medalists for Argentina
Olympic gold medalists for Argentina
Olympic medalists in field hockey
Medalists at the 2016 Summer Olympics
Pan American Games medalists in field hockey
Uhlenhorster HC players
SCHC players
Men's Hoofdklasse Hockey players
Argentine expatriate sportspeople in Germany
Argentine expatriate sportspeople in the Netherlands
Expatriate field hockey players
Medalists at the 2007 Pan American Games
Medalists at the 2011 Pan American Games
Medalists at the 2015 Pan American Games
Medalists at the 2019 Pan American Games
Sportspeople from Buenos Aires Province
21st-century Argentine people